Andersnatten is a mountain located at Eggedal in the municipality of Sigdal in Buskerud, Norway. 

Andersnatten is a distinctive, round-topped mountain that rises out of the valley floor. Norwegian artists Theodor Kittelsen and Christian Skredsvig both made paintings of the mountain.

Andersnatten has a height of 733 meters above sea level. The southeast wall is popular among climbers, both summer and winter. The first route was established in 1942 by  mathematician and mountaineer Einar Hoff Hansen (1923-1944) together with businessman, mountaineer and resistance fighter, Egmont Victor Boeck Nørregaard (1917-2014).

References

External links
Andersnatten Gjestegård 
Sigdal og Eggedal Turistservice AS

Sigdal
Mountains of Viken